Sentinel is a reggae and dancehall sound system from Stuttgart, Germany, best known for winning the 2005 World Clash in Brooklyn, New York.

Clashes 
 Kill Or Be Killed 2001 - Sentinel vs Supersonic vs Wadada vs Budadub - Köln
 Riddim Clash 2003 - Sentinel vs Black Kat vs Killamanjaro vs Downbeat - München
 Sentinel vs Turboforce - Middleton, Jamaica, 2003
 Sentinel vs Soundquake - Erlangen, 2004
 World Clash NYC 2005 - Sentinel vs. Black Kat vs. Bass Odyssey vs. Mighty Crown vs. Desert Storm vs. Immortal
 World Clash NYC 2006 - Sentinel vs. Black Kat vs. Bass Odyssey vs. Black Reaction vs. Sound Trooper
 UK Cup Clash 2006 - Bass Odyssey vs. Sound Trooper vs. Sentinel vs. King Tubbys vs. LP International vs. XTC 4x4
 Sentinel vs. Sound Trooper 2007, New York, USA (no winner declared)
 Riddim Clash 2007 - David Rodigan vs. Sentinel vs. Black Scorpio, Düsseldorf
 World Clash NYC 2007 - Sentinel vs. Black Kat vs. Bass Odyssey vs. Mighty Crown vs. Rebel Tone (no show)
 UK Cup Clash 2008 - The Final Conflict - Sentinel vs. Black Kat vs. Bass Odyssey vs. Mighty Crown vs. Tony Matterhorn vs. David Rodigan vs. Killamanjaro
 War Territory 2008 - Sentinel vs. One Love - Mailand, Italy, 2008
 Sound Fi Dead 2008 - Sentinel vs. Synemaxx vs. Black kat vs. Silverstar vs. Killamanjaro, Elderslie, Jamaica
 War Inna East 2009 - Sentinel & Supersonic vs. Tek 9 & Poison Dart, Enschede, the Netherlands
 War Territory 2009 - Bass Odyssey vs. Sentinel, Mailand, Italy
 Sound Fi Dead 2009 - Synemaxx vs. Black Kat vs. Sentinel vs. Black Blunt vs. Sound Trooper, Elderslie, Jamaica
 US World Clash vs. UK Cup Clash 2010 - Mighty Crown & Sentinel & Black Kat & Killamanjaro vs. David Rodigan & One Love & Bass Odyssey & Tony Matterhorn
 Death Before Dishonor 2010 - Mighty Crown vs. Tony Matterhorn (no show) vs. Bredda Hype vs. Sentinel vs. Black Kat vs. Bass Odyssey, Montego Bay, Jamaica
 The Real Deal 2010 - X-Caliber vs. Sentinel vs. Tek 9, Port-of-Spain, Trinidad
 Sound Fi Dead 2010 - Tek 9 vs. Black Scorpio vs. Sentinel vs. Black Kat vs. Bodyguard vs. Sound Trooper (last three no-show)

References

External links
Sentinel Sound website
Sentinel's Kingston Hot Radio
Interview with Sentinel Sound (English, published on Reggae.Today)

Sound systems